Gus H. Dean (born August 19, 1994) is an American professional stock car racing driver who competes part-time in the ARCA Menards Series, driving the No. 55 and 15 Toyota Camrys for Venturini Motorsports. He previously drove in the series for Win-Tron Racing full-time in 2017 and 2018 and part-time in 2016, 2019 and 2020. Dean also drove for Mason Mitchell Motorsports part-time in ARCA in 2016, winning the race at Talladega that year. Dean also competed in the NASCAR Camping World Truck Series full-time in 2019 for Young's Motorsports and part-time in 2020 in 2021 for Hill Motorsports.

Racing career

ARCA Menards Series

Dean began racing part-time in 2016 with Mason Mitchell Motorsports, scoring 1 win at Talladega in April. In 2017, he ran the full schedule with Win-Tron Racing, scoring a 4th-place points finish but lost rookie of the year to Riley Herbst in the season finale at Kansas. He return to the organization in 2018, scoring his second career win at Elko Speedway and finishing 6th in final points.

NASCAR Truck Series
On January 9, 2019, it was announced that Dean would drive the No. 12 full-time for Young's Motorsports in 2019. He finished his Truck rookie season 15th in points.

Dean lost his ride at Young's Motorsports after the 2019 season. On February 4, 2020, he joined Hill Motorsports in their No. 56 Chevrolet Silverado for the season opener at Daytona International Speedway.

Motorsports career results

NASCAR
(key) (Bold – Pole position awarded by qualifying time. Italics – Pole position earned by points standings or practice time. * – Most laps led.)

Camping World Truck Series

 Season still in progress
 Ineligible for series points

ARCA Menards Series
(key) (Bold – Pole position awarded by qualifying time. Italics – Pole position earned by points standings or practice time. * – Most laps led.)

ARCA Menards Series East

References

External links

 
 

Living people
1994 births
Racing drivers from South Carolina
ARCA Menards Series drivers
NASCAR drivers